Zenobia (c. 240–272) was Queen of the Palmyrene Empire.

Zenobia may also refer to:

People
Zenobia of Armenia (1st century CE), Queen of Armenia
Zenobios and Zenobia (d. c. 290), martyrs

Fictional characters
Zenobia (Conan), in the Conan the Barbarian mythos
Zenobia, a character in Ethan Frome
Zenobia, a character in Blithedale Romance
Zenobia, a character in Blood and Gold
Zenobia, a villain in Sinbad and the Eye of the Tiger
Zenobia "Nobby" Hopwood, a character in several Jeeves novels and short stories by P. G. Wodehouse

Culture
:de:Zenobia (Metastasio), libretto by Metastasio set first by Bononcini 1737, then by 24 other composers, including:
Zenobia (Hasse), one of several operas.
Zenobia in Palmira, by Leonardo Leo (1694–1744) 
Zenobia, by Luca Antonio Predieri (1688–1767)
Zenobia, by Louis Adolphe Coerne (1870–1922)
 Zenobia (play), a 1768 play by Arthur Murphy
Zenobia, an 1837 novel by William Ware
Zenobia (ballet), a ballet by George Balanchine for Richard Rodgers's 1936 musical On Your Toes
Zenobia (film), a 1939 American comedy film directed by Gordon Douglas

Places
Halabiye or Zenobia, now an archaeological site, Syria
Zenobia, Illinois, an unincorporated community, United States
840 Zenobia, an asteroid

Ships

Other uses
Zenobia (bird), a specific notable bird living in Syria
Zenobia (plant), a North American genus of shrubs
Zenobia swallowtail (Papilio zenobia), an African butterfly

People with the middle name
L. Zenobia Coleman (1898-1999), American librarian

People with the given name
Zenobia Camprubí (1887–1956), Spanish-born writer, poet and translator
Zenobia Galar (born 1958), Dominican painter
Zenobia Gilpin (c1898–1948), American physician and clubwoman
Zenobia Kloppers (born 1974), Namibian actress
Zenobia Powell Perry (1908–2004), American composer
Zenobia Shroff (born 1965), Indian-American actress

See also
Zenobios (disambiguation)